Topological inhibitors are rigid three-dimensional molecules of inorganic, organic, and hybrid compounds (as guests) that form multicentered supramolecular interactions in vacant cavities of protein macromolecules and their complexes (as hosts) .
Extensive surface and very diverse geometry make cage compounds with an encapsulated metal ion (clathrochelates) suitable for targeting both the active and allosteric sites of enzymes as well as the interfaces of their macromolecular complexes. An efficient structure- and concentration-dependent transcription inhibition in a model in vitro systems based on RNA and DNA polymerases by the iron(II) mono- and bis-clathrochelates at their submicro- and nanomolar concentrations, respectively, is observed in. Molecular docking and preincubation experiments suggested that these cage compounds form supramolecular assemblies with protein residues as well as with DNA and RNA. Thus, they are prospective precursors for the design of antiviral and anticancer drug candidates.

The modern approach to the pharmaceutical screening is based on several paradigms and empirical rules. They limit the chemical compounds that have a potential as pharmaceuticals for diagnostics and therapy; many chemical systems and classes have been excluded from the routine screening studies and, therefore, are terra incognita for biochemists, pharmacologists, and clinicians. For example, one of the Lipinski's rules states that the molecular weight of the chemical compounds that can be used for pharmaceutical screening should be under 500 Da. The biological activity of these low-weight compounds, constituting up to 90% of the pharmaceutical market (by nomenclature), in most cases is governed by their interactions with biological targets via either covalent or supramolecular bonding. The selectivity and specificity of these interactions determine the potential of the low-weight chemical compounds in drug therapy (for example, in the cases of the virus infections and the neurodegenerative diseases). Among the low-weight pharmaceuticals, the xenobiotic and abiotic compounds, which have neither the natural analogs nor the structural similarity to the biological molecules, are of particular interest. An example of such abiotic (xenobiotic) compounds is the carbocyclic adamantane derivatives. These compounds are widely used in drug therapy of the human diseases.

Second type of the pharmaceuticals available on the market comprises the biological, biologically revealed, and biomimetic macromolecules with molecular weights more than 2000 Da, the therapeutic activity of which is defined mainly by the complex protein – protein interactions. This class of the high-weight biological macromolecules includes, for example, insulins, enzymes, interferons, proteins (albumin, etc.), and vaccines as well.
At the same time, only limited number of the middle-weight compounds with a molecular weight from 500 to 2000 Da is used as the therapeutics or is now under study as potent chemical compounds for drug therapy and diagnostics.

Besides the restrictions applied on the bioavailability of the middle-weight molecules, their screening seems to be prospective owing to the multicentered and geometrically directed interactions that these molecules can form with biological targets (i.e., the topological recognition of a “guest” middle-weight molecule by a “host” biological receptor).

The success of the drug therapy of the virus and Parkinson's diseases using abiotic polyhedral adamantane molecules suggests the pharmaceutical potential of other xenobiotics with rigid three-dimensional molecular structure. For example, the functionalized fullerenes have been used for drug therapy of the HIV and other viruses: their hydrophobic ball-like molecules “block” a virus active site. This site can also be a target for other xenobiotics, which are geometrically similar to those of the functionalized fullerenes and are complementary to the HIV protease active site. Cage complexes with a metal ion encapsulated in a three-dimensional macropolycyclic ligand cavity (clathrochelates) are the topological analogs of the fullerene derivatives with similar geometric parameters. This similarity between the clathrochelates and the functionalized fullerenes has been confirmed by the molecular docking of a set of the clathrochelate structures to the active site of the HIV protease. Most these calculated macrobicyclic inhibitors have the same mode of the inhibition as their fullerene-containing analogs, and the calculated (for clathrochelates and fullerenes) and experimental (for fullerenes) inhibition constants are close.

When the influence of the cage metal complexes on biochemical processes is based on the topological similarity of their molecules to those of the chemical compounds with improved biological and pharmaceutical activities, the applicability of these clathrochelates is determined by their availability. The clathrochelate molecules have four axes and eight sites of functionalization. In contrast to the functionalized fullerenes, such direct functionalization may be easily employed using convenient procedures and commercially available chemical reagents. Thus, the three-dimensional rigid cage molecules with given location of the pharmacophore substituents can be obtained, i.e. it is possible to use their clathrochelate frameworks as the three-dimensional scaffolds for the design of the topological drugs.

So, (i) the specific abiotic interactions of the middle-weight molecules (for example, the clathrochelates) with biological macromolecules are possible, (ii) these interactions may change both the structure and the functions of these macromolecules, (iii) the middle-weight conformationally rigid macropolycyclic complexes with biomimetic substituents (“guests”) that bind to the molecules of the biological target (“hosts”) are prospective for the drug design, (iv) the macropolycyclic framework may be considered as a scaffold for the direct “bottom-up” synthesis of the biologically active compounds based on the “geometrical recognition” and “topological invasion” principles, (v) the clathrochelate complexes of transition metals are suitable for the design of the “topological drugs” owing to the availability of these geometrically well-organized three-dimensional macrobicycles, (vi) there are effective pathways for the direct synthesis of the functionalized clathrochelates with different symmetry, structure, and chemical reactivity, as well as of the complexes with given physical and physico-chemical properties.

The concept of the “topological drugs” seems to be a promising one for the drug search from the library of the middle-weight compounds as well as for the decrease of the resistance to the pharmaceutically active chemical compounds. This concept needs both the theoretical studies and the experimental improvements of different biological and biomimetic systems as well as of various types of the cage complexes.

References 

Drugs